USS Hoel (DD-768) was a planned United States Navy Gearing-class destroyer laid down during World War II but never completed. The ship was to be named after William R. Hoel (1824-1879), a United States Navy officer Navy Cross recipient.
 
Hoel was laid down by the Bethlehem Shipbuilding Corporation at San Francisco, California on 21 April 1944. The end of World War II in August 1945 resulted in the termination of the contract for her construction on 13 September 1946. She was stricken from the Naval Vessel Register that day and scrapped on the building ways.

References
 NavSource Naval History Photographic History of the United States Navy Destroyer Archive USS Hoel (DD-768)

 

World War II destroyers of the United States
Ships built in San Francisco
Cancelled ships of the United States Navy
1946 ships
Gearing-class destroyers of the United States Navy